Bobby Miller may refer to:

Bobby Miller (Gaelic footballer) (1950–2006), Irish Gaelic footballer and ball club manager
Bobby Miller (musician) (born 1966), American musician
Bobby Miller (filmmaker), American film-maker
Bobby Miller (baseball) (born 1999), American baseball player

See also
Robert Miller (disambiguation)